Commander Frank Noel Stagg, RN, (25 December 1884 in Tonbridge, Kent—25 October 1956 in London) was a Royal Navy officer known for his role in Danish and Norwegian resistance movements during the Second World War.

Staggs was a Naval Control Service Officer in Trondheim and Copenhagen before the war, and was connected with the Norwegian Section of Special Operations Executive from October 1940 to July 1942, He was the planner of the raid on the Lofoten Islands.

He was honoured for services to the Norwegian Navy at St Olav  on 17 October 1944.

Early life

In his youth, Stagg attended Charterhouse School. He entered the Royal Navy 15 January 1900.

He named the Stagg Patches shoal off Queensland, whilst aboard surveying vessel  from 1907 to 1909.

Later life

Stagg wrote several historical works, including five books about the history of Norway and its links to British history. He is also known for his contributions to local history, both in his home county of Kent and further afield, serving for a time as chairman of the County Local History Committee of the Kent Council of Social Services. He died 25 October 1956 in London.

List of Publications

References 

1884 births
1956 deaths
Royal Navy officers of World War II
Danish resistance movement
Norwegian resistance movement
People from Tonbridge
People educated at Charterhouse School